PHSCologram is a registered trademark for barrier-strip and lenticular autostereograms made by Chicago-based art collective (Art)n laboratory.

The barrier strip technique is similar in principle to lenticular printing, but with the use of a black line grid instead of a lenticular lens to select which image is seen.

The capital letters in the name stand for photography, holography, sculpture, and computer graphics. The term was originally coined to refer to larger sculptural installations that included actual holograms as well as barrier-strip autostereograms, but in later years the name was taken to apply to digital autostereographic panels alone.

PHSColograms may be seen in permanent installations at the Museum of Jewish Heritage, the Hope Diamond exhibit at the Smithsonian Museum of Natural History, Chicago Midway International Airport, and in the collection of Elton John.

Notable PHSCologram collaborators
 Ed Paschke
 Dan Sandin
 Tom DeFanti
 Donna Cox
 Miroslaw Rogala
 Charles Csuri
 Ellen Sandor

References

External links
(art)n Website

Description of the PHSCologram process

See also

Photographic techniques
3D imaging

ca:Visió estereoscòpica
cs:3D fotografie
de:Stereoskopie
es:Estereoscopía
ru:Стереоизображение